The Agricultural Research Council of Nigeria (ARCN) is a Nigerian government agency coordinating and monitoring agricultural research to increase agricultural productivity for economic development. The agency also trains farmers. In 2021, the agency inaugurated Agricultural Radio and Television to disseminate information to farmers more effectively.

References 

Government of Nigeria
Agricultural organizations based in Nigeria